Charles Stuart ( 1758 – 31 March 1828) was an officer in the East India Company Army and is well known for being one of the few British officers to embrace Hindu culture while stationed there, earning the nickname Hindoo Stuart. He also wrote books and several newspaper articles extolling Hindu culture and tradition and urging its adoption by Europeans settled in India, and deploring the attitudes and activities of the Utilitarians and missionaries who deprecated Indian culture. He is mentioned in William Dalrymple's book White Mughals (2002).

Background and family
Stuart was said to be the son of Thomas Smyth, Mayor of Limerick and MP for Limerick City. His grandparents were Charles Smyth (1694–1783), also MP for Limerick, and Elizabeth, daughter of Sir Thomas Prendergast, 1st Baronet.

His nephews included the diplomat Robert Stuart and the naturalist and surgeon James Stuart. The clergyman and footballer Robert King was his great-nephew.

In India
In his teens, Stuart left Ireland for India, where he remained for the rest of his life. He served in the army and starting as a cadet, he rose through the ranks to become a Major-General. His last command was the Saugor Field Force.

Stuart enthusiastically embraced Hindu culture and championed the same in his writings and discourse, which earned him the nickname Hindoo Stuart. V. C. P. Hodson's biography of Stuart mentions that he "had studied the language, manners, and customs of the natives of this country with so much enthusiasm, his intimacy with them ... obtained for him the name of Hindoo Stuart".

Stuart took to Hinduism both in its religious aspects and as a way of daily life. He adopted many Hindu customs and routines of daily life, including bathing in the Ganges at Calcutta every morning. He amassed a collection of Hindu deities and icons of worship. Archie Baron says, in his book An India Affair:
"It was far easier to break into Muslim society than the exclusive and mysterious world of brahminical Hinduism which makes 'Hindoo Stuart' a rarity even among White Moghuls... His Hinduism was on open display to the whole of Calcutta. As far as one can tell, this does not seem to have set back his career".

He quickly took to wearing Indian clothes, and this became his normal garb when off the parade ground. He encouraged his Indian sepoys to wear full moustaches in the Indian style on parade. His commander-in-chief "ticked him off" due to his partiality towards sepoys sporting "Rajput moustaches or brightly coloured caste marks on their foreheads". Declaring Indian garments best suited to the weather of India, he actively promoted their adoption by Europeans settled in India. He wrote newspaper articles on this subject frequently ("frequent and vigorous" contributions to the daily Calcutta Telegraph in the year 1800) and strongly encouraged European ladies in India to adopt the sari.

Stuart published his letters extolling the virtues of "elegant, simple, sensible, and sensual" Indian saris vis-a-vis "the prodigious structural engineering Europeon (sic) women strapped themselves into, in order to hold their bellies in, project their breasts out and allow their dresses to balloon grandly up and over towards the floor" along with some replies by "outraged" white women in a "deliciously silly volume" entitled The Ladies Monitor, Being A Series of Letters First published in Bengal on the Subject of Female Apparel Tending to Favour a regulated adoption of Indian Costume And a rejection of Superfluous Vesture By the Ladies of this country With Incidental remarks on Hindoo Beauty, Whale-Bone Stays, Iron Busks, Indian Corsets, Man-Milliners, Idle Bachelors, Hair-Powder, Waiting Maids, And Footmen.  Some of the reasons he cites for European women to give up iron busks are: Firstly wearing iron busks makes women highly susceptible to lightning strikes (exhorting them with sentences such as "This is no laughing matter ladies for I am absolutely serious"). Secondly by discarding iron busks from their wardrobes, European women would immensely enhance the supply of iron in Bengal for farmers who desperately need new wagon wheels. Archie Baron says, in his book An India Affair:"For all this lubriciousness, Stuart should not be regarded as some dirty old man or prototype sex tourist."

In his book Vindication of the Hindoos (1808), Stuart criticised the work of European missionaries in India, claiming that: "Hinduism little needs the meliorating hand of Christianity to render its votaries a sufficiently correct and moral people for all the useful purposes of a civilised society." In this book. Stuart defends Hinduism from assaults by missionaries explaining: "Wherever I look around me, in the vast ocean of Hindu mythology, I discover Piety... Morality... and as far as I can rely on my judgement, it appears the most complete and ample system of Moral Allegory that the world has ever produced." Throughout this book Stuart, warns of the dangers of the "obnoxious" missionaries and of attempts to convert Indians to Christianity, a process he describes as "impolitic, inexpedient, dangerous, unwise and insane".  He asks "if their religion is insulted what confidence can we repose in the fidelity of our Hindu soldiers?" presaging, it is said, some of the causes of the Mutiny of 1857.

Legacy

Though Stuart often spoke of his conversion to Hinduism he had not entirely rejected Christian doctrines as he held the Hindu deity Krishna to be the Spirit of God who descends upon earth for the benefit of mankind which he believed was "not very inconsistent with Christianity" and "he was content to be buried in an Anglican cemetery, albeit along with his favourite idols".

Stuart died on 31 March 1828 and was buried with his deities at the South Park Street Cemetery in Calcutta, in a tomb which took the form of a Hindu temple.

His remarkable collection of antiquities forms the basis of the British Museum's ancient Hindu and Buddhist sculpture collection from the Indian subcontinent, now known as the Bridge Collection.

Published works

References

Further reading
W. Dalrymple, White Mughals (2002)
V. C. P. Hodson (Major), List of Officers of the Bengal Army, 1758–1834, Part IV (1947)
Dictionary of National Biography – Stuart, Charles (Vol. 53, pp. 141–142)

External links
Article on Hindoo Stuart's Grave and other graves of South Park Street Cemetery

1758 births
1828 deaths
Converts to Hinduism
Irish Hindus
Military personnel from County Limerick
18th-century Irish people
British East India Company Army generals